Honor Kneafsey is a British actress, best known for her voice role as Robyn Goodfellowe in Wolfwalkers.

Kneafsey started her career as a child actress, such as her role as June, the youngest child of historical figure George Mottershead, in the BBC1 drama Our Zoo (2014), or the young character Christine who works in, and later burns down, the eponymous The Bookshop (2017). She has made numerous television, film and West End stage appearances.

Filmography

Film

Television

Theatre

Awards and nominations

References

External links
 

Living people
British film actresses
British television actresses
21st-century British actresses
British child actresses
2004 births